The Oranjestad Streetcar is a single-track tram line in Oranjestad, the capital city of Aruba. It is owned and operated by Arubus, the national public transportation company.  It was built as a key component of a larger project to upgrade the main retail areas of the town, other aspects of which included pedestrianization of streets, planting of trees, installation of ornamental street lighting and resurfacing of streets and sidewalks.

History
The line is the first and so far the only passenger rail service on the island and the rest of the Dutch Caribbean. Three industrial railways had been constructed on the island, but have all closed. It was inaugurated on 22 December 2012, seven days after the arrival of the first single-deck car. Regular service started on 19 February 2013.  The second car, an open-top double-decker, was delivered in June 2013. The heritage style streetcars were designed and manufactured by TIG/m Modern Street Railways in California, USA.

The line operates daily. , service was operating from 9:00 to 17:00, with two cars in service after 11:00.

Route
The line starts from a balloon loop near the Port of Call and serves the downtown area with a route along Schelpstraat, Havenstraat and Caya Betico Croes, the main road, which is open to pedestrians only. Between Rancho and Plaza Chipi Chipi, eastbound trams (towards Plaza Nicky) run via Schelpstraat, and westbound ones (towards Port of Call), run via Havenstraat. It ends at Plaza Nicky, with a stop also located on a loop.

The depot is located between the stops at Port of Call and Rancho.

N1Eastbound trams "Port–Plaza Nicky" only
N2Westbound trams "Plaza Nicky–Port" only

Rolling stock
The fleet is composed of 4 streetcars: 2 single-decker (green and orange) and 2 open-top double-decker (blue and red) cars. The vehicles, assembled by TIG/m in Chatsworth, USA, use hydrail technology: they are powered by batteries augmented by hydrogen fuel cells.

See also

List of town tramway systems in North America
Queen Beatrix International Airport
Transport in Aruba

References

External links

Arubus official website

TIG/m LLC Modern Street Railways official website

2010s establishments in Aruba
Tram
Railway lines opened in 2012
Oranjestad
Oranjestad
Tramways with double-decker trams
Hydrogen rolling stock